Mohave Valley School District 16 is a school district in Mohave County, Arizona.  The district draws students from Fort Mojave and Mohave Valley as well as the Fort Mojave Indian Reservation.

Schools
 Mohave Valley Junior High School (grades 6-8)
 Camp Mohave Elementary School (grades 3-5)
 Fort Mohave Elementary School (Kindergarten-grade 2)

References

External links
 

School districts in Mohave County, Arizona